The Coalinga Tigers (a.k.a. Savages) were a minor league baseball team in the Class D San Joaquin Valley League in 1910 and 1911.

External links
Baseball Reference

Baseball teams established in 1910
Sports clubs disestablished in 1911
Defunct San Joaquin Valley League teams
Professional baseball teams in California
Defunct baseball teams in California
Baseball teams disestablished in 1911